Youcef Sabri Medel (born 5 July 1996) is a badminton player from Algeria. He won the boys' doubles silver and singles bronze at the 2014 African Youth Games in Gaborone, Botswana. Medel was the gold medalists at the 2017, 2019, 2020, 2021 and 2022 African Championships for men's double with his partner, Koceila Mammeri.

Achievements

African Championships 
Men's doubles

Mediterranean Games 
Men's doubles

African Youth Games 
Boys' singles

Boys' doubles

BWF International Challenge/Series (5 titles, 2 runners-up) 
Men's singles

Men's doubles

  BWF International Challenge tournament
  BWF International Series tournament
  BWF Future Series tournament

References

External links 
 

1996 births
Living people
Sportspeople from Algiers
21st-century Algerian people
Algerian expatriate sportspeople in France
Algerian male badminton players
Competitors at the 2015 African Games
Competitors at the 2019 African Games
African Games silver medalists for Algeria
African Games medalists in badminton
Competitors at the 2022 Mediterranean Games
Mediterranean Games gold medalists for Algeria
Mediterranean Games medalists in badminton